The Minister for Youth and Sports in Ghana heads the Ministry of Youth and Sports. This role has been combined with the heading of other ministries in the past. Under the NRC and SMC military governments, it was headed by a Commissioner for Education, Culture and Sports. Under the Limann government, the head was the Minister for Culture and Sport. During the era of the PNDC military government, the head was designated the Secretary for Youth and Sports. During the Kufuor government period, the designations have included Minister for Education, Youth and Sports, Minister for Education and Sports and Minister for Education, Science and Sports.
Following Ghana attaining a Republican status in 1960, President Kwame Nkrumah appointed Ohene Djan Director of Sports of the Central Organisation of Sports (COS). This position was of ministerial status. Colonel I. K.  Acheampong who was Head of state of Ghana and Chairman of the ruling SMC also doubled as Commissioner for Sports until 1978. During this period, he appointed Lt. Colonel Simpe-Asante as the Special Assistant to the Commissioner for Sports.

List of ministers

See also
Ministry of Youth and Sports (Ghana)

References

External links
MINISTRY OF YOUTH AND SPORTS, GHANA - LIST OF MINISTERS

Politics of Ghana
Youth and Sports